The Hiwegi Formation is a geological formation on Rusinga Island in Kenya preserving fossils dating to the Early Miocene period. The Hiwegi Formation is known for the well preserved plant fossils it preserves, which indicate a tropical forest environment that underwent wet and dry periods. The middle members of the formation in particular indicate a brief period in which conditions were notably dryer with a more open environment compared to older and younger units. Some of the formation's fauna, such as an early ancestor of the modern aye-aye and a chameleon of the genus Calumma, link Miocene East Africa to modern day Madagascar.

History

The first discovery of fossil material by western researchers was documented in the early 20th century in the form of a British colonial report on the East Africa Protectorate. Excavations for fossils began in the 1930s with the work of Louis Leakey, followed by the British-Kenya Miocene Expedition. A major factor in the exploration of Rusinga Island was the discovery of several specimens originally assigned to the stem-hominoid Proconsul (now regarded as a distinct genus, Ekembo). Further interest for the formation was created due to the presence of ample non-primate fossil mammals, as well as a vast collection of fossil plants.

Geography
Outcrops of the Hiwegi Formation are found across Rusinga Island, an island at the eastern end of Lake Victoria within Kenyan territory. The island itself is situated close to the mouth of the Winam Gulf. The Hiwegi Formation has outcrops across the islands, in particular in the area north-east of Mbita Point. Additional outcrops are found around the mountain Lugongo in the center of the island, Waregi Hills in the east as well as near Kiahera and Kaswanga on the islands north-western shore.

Geology and Stratigraphy
The Hiwegi Formation is part of the larger Rusinga Group. During the Miocene the sediments now forming Rusinga Island were deposited on the flanks of the Kisingiri Volcano, which had formed in the early Miocene. Two hypothesis have formed around the volcano's influence on the sediments. Drake et al. hypothesize that the Hiwegi Formation, alongside the Kiahera and Rusinga Agglomerate were deposited during early eruptions of the Kisingiri Volcano, prior to a period of silence during which the Kulu Formation was deposited and a second period of eruptions later. Bestland et al (1995) meanwhile suggest that the Kisingiri Volcano experienced up to three periods of activity, with the strata of the Hiwegi Formation being deposited in the second and third period of volcanic activity. The formation generally underlies the younger Kulu Formation and overlies the Rusinga Agglomerate. However at Waregi Hills, in the east of the island, the formation overlies the Ombonya Beds which are found nowhere else on Rusinga. The sediments in this region are overlain by the Kiangata Agglomerate and the Lunene Lavas.

The formation is divided into four members.
Kaswanga Point Member
The oldest member of the Hiwegi Formation, it consists primarily of air-filled tuffs and other units reworked from tuffaceous material. The fact that the member is composed of volcanic material indicates that the nearby Kisingiri Volcano was particularly active at the time the unit was deposited. Besides the tuffs this member also consists of fossil bearing mudstone which yielded fossil leaves in the Kiahera Hill fossil site, the sedimentology of which indicates deposition as part of a debris or mudflow following a volcanic eruption.
Grit Member
The Grit Member is the second oldest member of the formation and underlies the Fossil Bed Member. It is primarily composed of tuffaceous sandstones and conglomerates consisting of pebbles in a sandy matrix. The layers of the Member indicate a fluvial or ponded mode of deposition which contrasts with the volcanic deposition of the Kibanga and Kaswanga Point Members. Palaeosols are found intercalated into these sediments. This member, as well as the overlying fossil bed member, were likely deposited in floodplain channels during flashfloods and mudflows. Additionally, they show signs of dryer conditions leading to salt hoppers and mud cracks. 
Fossil Bed Member
The Fossil Bed Member shows no differences in sedimentology compared to the Grit Member and was distinguished from the former on the basis of fossil material being absent in the older unit. Due to this lack of distinguishing features, the two groups are put together by Michel et al. (2020).
Kibanga Member
Overall the Kibanga Member is dominated by airfilled tuffs much like the Kaswanga Point Member and is interbedded with sandstone, conglomerates and palaeosol. The fossil leaf bearing units of the Kibanga Member show a mix of interbedding layers of sandstone and mudstone. The mudstone was likely deposited during periodical wet seasons when ponds formed, followed by dry seasons creating desiccation cracks which are fond atop some of the mudstone layers.

K–Ar dating suggests a mean age of 17.8 million years for the formation. which correlates with the Burdigalian stage of the Miocene. In accordance with this method, the sediments of the Hiwegi Formation are thought to have been deposited over a short period of time, approximately 500.000 years. However dating of the formation has been met with difficulty due to the loss of certain minerals due to Diagenesis, the absence of other minerals important for dating and the effects of the Kisingiri volcano, which erupted through Precambrian sediments. Using Ar-Ar dating rather than K-Ar dating yields different results, still correlating to the Burdigalian but with a longer timespan dating from 20 to 17 million years ago.

Paleoenvironment
Early studies on the paleoenvironment of the Hiwegi Formation resulted in a variety of contradicting hypothesis, suggesting environments ranging from tropical rainforest to semi-arid habitats. Later research consistently concluded that these mixed results were caused by imprecise sampling, using fossil material from different parts of Rusinga Island corresponding with different ages and treating them as being contemporary. Subsequently, scientists focused on much narrower regions, resulting in more consistent and precise results that showed a distinct change in environment between the different members of the formation. Among the most in depth works on the paleoenvironment was a publication by Baumgartner and Peppe from 2021. In this publication the authors analysed new material from the R3 (Kibanga Member) and Kiahera Hills localities (Kaswanga Point Member) while comparing the material to prior work and material from the R5 locality (Grit Member).

Kaswanga Point Member

The fossils from the Kaswanga Point Member, specifically the Kiahera Hills, consisted mostly of the remains of woody plants with only a single monocot present and no herbaceous plants. This may however be tied to the way the plant material at Kiahera Hills was preserved, as the fossils are fragmentary and are thought to have been deposited following a short transportation related to a volcanic eruption. Thus, Baumgartner and Peppe suggest that herbaceous plants may not have been sturdy enough to withstand transportation. The great sample size nevertheless indicates that herbaceous plants would be uncommon, while gymnosperms and seed ferns may have been absent altogether. All recovered leaves were untoothed and on average mesophyll. Both results are indicative of wet and tropical seasonal forest or rainforest. Specific comparison is drawn to the rainforests near Monrovia (Liberia) and Kakamega (Kenya) as well as the seasonal forests found in Abidjan (Côte d’Ivoire).

Grit Member
Research conducted by Collinson and colleagues in both 1985 and 2009 indicate a riverine woodland environment for the R117 locality within the Grit Member, basing their results on the fact that only 4.2% of the taxa analysed by them were definitive forest-dwellers. This interpretation is backed up by the presence of fossil seeds assigned to Cissus rusingensis, who's closest living relatives inhabit the same kind of environment suggested by Collinson.

A study from 2013 analysed fossil plant material collected at the R5 locality close to Kaswanga, north-west Rusinga Island, which was roughly contemporary to the locality studied by Collinson in 1985. Maxbauer and colleagues identify 5 stratigraphic layers within the Grit Member, which indicate the presence of moving water in some of them and signs of dryer conditions in others. The presence of grasses sharing affinities with Typha and Phragmites, known to inhabit wetland environments, as well as the fluvial sediments they were preserved in indicate a floodplain environment that was periodically flooded or at least submerged on occasion. High mean annual temperatures can be inferred from the leaf shapes (generally untoothed), however the authors refrain from calculating any precise temperatures given the limited sample size. The presence of salt hoppers furthermore indicates that the water at the locality at least sometimes evaporated, which in combination with the high temperatures may suggest seasons of low to no rainfall. The authors of the 2013 study do however note that there is no direct correlation between the studied area, which is part of the Grits Member, and the overlying Fossil Bed Member which yielded the majority of fossil vertebrate remains known from the formation. Overall Maxbauer and colleagues argue for a seasonal riparian environment covered in a patchwork of forests and woodlands.

Although monocot diversity was low, Baumgartner and Peppe point out that they were among the most abundant morphotypes present. These results recovered by the 2021 study generally support Maxbauer's previous hypothesis of a riparian woodland environment with episodic dry periods followed by wet periods. This cycle would have created standing bodies of water which were inhabited hy crocodiles and hippos while rhino and primate fossils suggest the presence of both more open and closed environments within the unit.

Kibanga Member
A study by Michael et al. analysed fossils from the R3 locality, which corresponds with the youngest member of the formation. Their research concluded that during that time the region was covered by dense, multistoried  rainforests. Baumgartner and Peppe recognize that the vast majority of plant fossils were woody dicots of excellent preservation. Monocots and other herbaceous plants were however more prominent in this member than in older units, with varied flora occurring in patches. Some areas for instance were dominated by reeds or emergent aquatic plants (plants that root in the bodies of water but emerge above the surface). The distribution of woody plants and the patches of monocots is consistent with the tree stumps observed by Michael and colleagues, with areas poor in tree stumps being the same areas that yielded more remains of grasses. These results are somewhat cooler and drier than the estimates for the Kaswanga Point Member and indicate tropical seasonal forests or woodlands to have been present during this stage of the Hiwegi Formation. The environment would have likely shown a patchwork of both densely wooded areas and more open areas containing periodic ponds and reeds. Analysis of the paleosol indicates the presence of distinct dry and wet seasons. Compared to the Kaswanga Point Member the Kibanga Member appears to have also been less diverse and is considered to be most similar to the environments today found in Abidjan (Côte d’Ivoire) and Kibwezi (Kenya).

Paleofauna
The following fauna list is primarily based on the list published by Michel and colleagues in 2020, which incorporates prior work by Pickford (1986).

Reptiles

Birds

Mammalia

Afrotheria

Artiodactyla

Carnivora

Eulipotyphla

Glires

Hyaenodonta

Perissodactyla

Primates

References

Geologic formations of Kenya
Miocene Africa
Paleontology in Kenya